Jaydee Bixby (born August 14, 1990) is a Canadian country musician who was the runner-up on the fifth season of Canadian Idol.  In 2008 he signed with Her Royal Majesty's Records and went on to release his debut album Cowboys and Cadillacs. Moving on to On Ramp Records in 2010, he released his second album Easy to Love.

Before Canadian Idol 
Bixby was born in Drumheller, Alberta, where he grew up. He moved to Red Deer, Alberta where he attended Hunting Hills High School. He was in a band called the "Bixbys" with his mother, father, and a family friend; they played at bars, weddings and rodeos. Jaydee has five sisters, four older and one younger. His father taught him guitar.

Canadian Idol 
Bixby auditioned for Canadian Idol in Calgary, Alberta. He sang "Lawdy Miss Clawdy" in his audition, and prompted judge Zack Werner to ask him what decade it was in Red Deer. All four judges agreed that Bixby should go on to the Toronto round. During his first solo in the Toronto rounds, he prompted Werner to tell everyone that he was the competition. During the semi-final rounds of the show, the judges predicted him as a potential winner. He made the top 10, and gained the support of votefortheworst.com. He did well week one of the top 10, but after that failed to really impress the judges, until the top 5-week. Although Bixby never fell into the bottom 3, he was runner-up to Brian Melo on September 11, 2007.

Performances and results

Post Idol 
Bixby was a part of the Telus "Winners Tour" for the top 3 of Canadian Idol season 5, along with winner Brian Melo, and 3rd-place finisher Carly Rae Jepsen. Four shows were sold out in Bixby's hometown of Red Deer, Alberta, although only one was originally scheduled there. Since then Bixby has done shows with industry greats like Blake Shelton, Larry the Cable Guy, Jason Aldean, Taylor Swift, Kenny Chesney, Loretta Lynn, Kris Kristofferson, Charlie Daniels just to name a few.

Career

Cowboys and Cadillacs (2008–2009)
Bixby moved from Alberta to Vancouver to work on his music career, his first time living on his own. He was signed to Her Royal Majesty's Records/International Arts, and his debut album, Cowboys and Cadillacs was released on July 8, 2008. The album was recorded in Vancouver and featured some of his own songwriting.

Bixby also released a song called "21st Century Christmas," which debuted on the collaborative Open Road album Christmas on the Open Road. His charitable work includes fund-raising for World Vision.
In March 2009, he participated in Saskatoon's Kinsmen Telemiracle Marathon.

Easy to Love (2010–2012)
Bixby left Your Royal Majesty Records and was picked up by On Ramp Records. He released the single called "Boy Inside the Man." His second album, Easy to Love, was released on May 25, 2010.

On June 7, 2010, Bixby performed at the CMT Global Artist Party with 15 other international country stars.

Bixby, and other country stars from the Canadian Country Music Association hosted a Hall of Honour induction on September 10, 2010. Two more singles from Bixby followed in 2010, "Tailgate" and "Can't Ask (For More Than That)."

Jaydee was nominated for three awards for the 2010 British Columbia Country Music Awards.

Work in Progress (2013–2014)
Bixby left On Ramp Records to create his own label, Black Sheep Productions. His third album, Work in Progress, was released on August 13, 2013. Work in Progress features songs written by Bixby and a cover of Conway Twitty's "It's Only Make Believe". The song is endorsed by Conway Twitty's daughter Kathy.

Major record deal with Mid South Music Records (2015–present)
On January 30, 2015, he signed a major record deal with Mid South Music Records' former president TM Garret at Ardent Studios in Memphis, Tennessee. His 2015 World Tour will cover the United States, the United Kingdom and Australia, and will be supported by Co-Headliner Skyelor Anderson, who was in the Top 8 round on the US based X-Factor in 2011.

Discography

Studio albums

Singles

Music videos

Album appearances

Awards and nominations

See also
2008 in Canadian music

References

External links

Jaydee Bixby at CTV.ca

1990 births
Living people
Canadian Idol participants
Canadian country singer-songwriters
Canadian child singers
People from Drumheller
Musicians from Alberta